Urus, also known as Yanaraju (possibly from Quechua yana black, rahu snow, ice, mountain with snow,  "black snow peak"), is a  mountain in the Cordillera Blanca in the Andes of Peru. It located between Carhuaz and Huaraz provinces, in Ancash. Urus lies in Huascarán National Park, west of Tocllaraju.

References

External links 

Mountains of Peru
Mountains of Ancash Region
Huascarán National Park